A waddy, nulla-nulla or boondi is an Aboriginal Australian hardwood club or hunting stick for use as a weapon or as a throwing stick for hunting animals. Waddy comes from the Darug people of Port Jackson, Sydney. Boondi is the Wiradjuri word for this implement.

Description and use
A waddy is a heavy pointed club constructed of carved hardwood timber.

Waddies were used in hand-to-hand combat and were capable of splitting a shield and of killing or stunning prey. They could be employed also as projectiles or to make fire and make ochre. They found further use in punishing those who broke Aboriginal law.

Construction.
The waddy was made by both men and women and could be painted or left unpainted. Its construction varied from tribe to tribe, but it was generally about one metre in length and sometimes had a stone head attached with beeswax and at least one string. It was made from where a branch met the tree or from a young tree that was pulled up with its roots from the ground.

Alternative spellings
Waddy has also been spelled as wadi, wady, and waddie. The spelling stabilised around the mid-nineteenth century, partly to help distinguish it from the Arabic - Lebanese word , a dry water course. Nulla-nulla has been recorded with the following variations: nullah-nullah, nilla-nilla and nolla-nolla.

References

External links

 Nullah nullah

Australian Aboriginal bushcraft
Australian Aboriginal words and phrases
Australian inventions
Clubs (weapon)
Primitive weapons
Weapons of Australia